The Free Speech Coalition (FSC) is a non-profit trade association of the pornography and adult entertainment industry in the United States. Founded in 1991, it opposes the passage and enforcement of obscenity laws and many censorship laws (with the exception of "anti-piracy" laws).

History
Prior to the establishment of a private right to own pornographic material in Stanley v. Georgia in 1969, adult film producers and sex toy manufacturers had limited ability to organize. The first truly national group to emerge was the Adult Film Association of America (AFAA), an association of approximately 100 film producers, exhibitors, and distributors. The AFAA hired attorneys and created a legal kit that could be used by those facing censorship. With the advent of inexpensive home videos, the AFAA became the Adult Film and Video Association of America (AFVAA).

In 1987, adult film producer Hal Freeman was charged with pandering. In People v. Freeman, prosecutors argued that paying performers to have sex in an adult film was an act of prostitution. The case went to the US Supreme Court where the 1989 Freeman decision effectively legalized adult film production in California. Despite the ruling, law enforcement began aggressively targeting adult theaters and video stores for selling adult material. In 1990, the City of Los Angeles used zoning ordinances to try and shut down nearly a hundred adult video theaters and shops in the Hollywood area.

Following the recommendations of the Meese Commission, the Bush administration began attacking both small distributors and major manufacturers of adult video with sting operations. Between March 1990 and June 1991, the US Department of Justice and the Los Angeles police raided 40 adult film companies in Los Angeles. While pornography production was no longer illegal in California, producers could still be charged with the federal crime of interstate sale of obscene material and tried in more conservative areas.

Founding
In response to the attacks, adult producers formed the Free Speech Legal Defense Fund (FSLDF) to pool resources. In 1991, as the government attack was blunted, the FSLDF decided to select a name more reflective of its broadened role in the adult community, and the Free Speech Coalition was born. The association became closely aligned with other organizations representing the rights of free speech and civil liberties.

Organization
Free Speech Coalition (FSC) is the trade association of the adult entertainment industry in the United States. Founded in 1991, it opposes the passage and enforcement of some censorship laws (with the exception of "anti-piracy" laws) and obscenity laws.

On the FSC's website it states that over the course of its history it has "fought for the rights of producers, distributors, performers and consumers of adult entertainment and pleasure products through battles in the legislature, the courts, regulatory agencies, at the ballot box and in the press".

The FSC is also committed to intersectionality, supporting populations within the adult industry concerned with issues such as: "women’s health and reproductive rights, LGBT rights, immigration, sexual health and wellness, sex education, decriminalization of victims and workers, human trafficking, discrimination, racism, and consent".

In 1999, FSC hired its first full-time Executive Director, William R. "Bill" Lyon, and began to gain a national reputation as a defender of First and Fourth Amendment rights. During the Clinton Administration, there were few obscenity prosecutions. Then-Attorney General Janet Reno seemed to see "obscenity" as a victimless crime. She also realized that in many areas community standards had changed and "obscenity" convictions were becoming more difficult to sustain.

Management
2014
The 2014 Board consisted of the following: 
 Jeffrey Douglas - Board Chair, attorney
 Christian Mann - Board President, general manager at Evil Angel Productions, replacing former president Sid Grief
 Larry Garland - vice president, filling the position left empty by Mann
 Bob Christian - treasurer
 Mark Kernes - secretary

Other executives included:
 Diane Duke, executive director (primary spokesperson)

2015
For 2015, elections were held in December 2014. Incumbent members Kink.com founder Peter Acworth, attorney Jeffrey Douglas, XBIZ founder Alec Helmy, Vivid Entertainment's Marci Hirsch, Good Vibrations owner Joel Kaminsky, AVN legal analyst Mark Kernes, attorney Reed Lee, and Classic Erotica's Lynn Swanson won re-election. Continuing board members include Adam & Eve's Bob Christian, ElDorado Trading's Larry Garland, MOXXX Productions Mo Reese, ATMLA's Mark Schechter, and NakedSword's Tim Valenti, which brought the total number of board members to 13.

2016
HIV Activist Eric Paul Leue was hired as Executive Director to replace outgoing CEO Diane Duke.

2019
Executive Director Eric Paul Leue left in July and was replaced by Michelle L. LeBlanc in October.

Issues and initiatives
 Challenging 2257 regulations in court (Free Speech Coalition v. Gonzales)
 Opposing the proposed .xxx top-level domain
 Rebutting claims of pornography addiction and harmful "secondary effects" of pornography
 Workplace safety
 Anti-piracy efforts including the FSC Anti-Piracy Action Program and two Public Service Announcements
 The FSC supports the decriminalization of sex work and workers' rights.

Child Protection and Obscenity Enforcement Act
In 1995, a comprehensive Federal scheme regulating the creation and wholesale distribution of recorded images of sexual conduct went into effect. Aimed at detecting and deterring child pornography, the Federal Labeling Law (also known as the Child Protection and Obscenity Enforcement Act) eliminated all privacy in the creation of sexual images. Any producers of, and performers in, such materials were ordered to comply with detailed disclosure requirements. In order for the industry to comply, the FSC was essential. FSC conducted training seminars, prepared compliance documents and uniform exemption labels and negotiated with the Justice Department for relief from some of the more burdensome and unreasonable components of the law.

The FSC's response to the Federal Labeling Law that established broadly throughout the industry the necessity of a functional trade organization to assist the industry.

In 1996 the Communications Decency Act (CDA) was enacted to protect children from accessing adult material on the Internet. The Child Pornography Protection Act (CPPA) followed in 1997; this legislation sought to criminalize the depiction of minors in sexually explicit video or online content, even if those depicted in the material were over 18-years of age. The redefinition of child pornography to include adults appearing to be minors, engaging in actual or simulated sexual activity was controversial. The Senate Judiciary Committee (the committee of origin), never even held a vote on the bill, yet it was signed into law, following Senator Orrin Hatch (R-Utah) attaching it during the Conference Committee to the October 1997 Spending Bill. Under the definition, films such as Midnight Cowboy, The Last Picture Show, Animal House, A Clockwork Orange, Halloween, Fast Times at Ridgemont High, Return to the Blue Lagoon, The Exorcist, Risky Business, Porky's, Bull Durham, Blowup, Dirty Dancing, and The People vs. Larry Flynt were subject to prosecution and potentially a five-year mandatory minimum imprisonment. When these concerns were brought to Senator Hatch's staff, they responded by conceding that such films could be charged but that "legitimate" movies need not fear prosecution. The FSC challenged the constitutionality of the law. For the first time since its own redefinition as a trade association, FSC undertook litigation challenging the constitutionality of a Federal statute.

FSC filed suit against then-Attorney General John Ashcroft, charging that the CPPA abridged first amendment rights by defining protected speech as obscene or as child pornography. In 2002, FSC views were upheld in the US Supreme Court in Ashcroft v. Free Speech Coalition, the "virtual child porn" case.

In 2005, FSC filed a complaint against the Dept of Justice and then-Attorney General Alberto Gonzales, citing that 18 U.S.C. § 2257 regulations endangered the privacy and safety of performers by allowing private information to be accessed through the record-keeping process; also that 2257 regulations were complicated to the extent that adult producers would be unable to fully comply with the record-keeping system.

The controversial regulations have been an ongoing issue for adult industry producers and FSC. In February 2009, the United States Court of Appeals for the Sixth Circuit held in Connection Distributing Co. v. Holder that the record-keeping provisions of 18 U.S.C. § 2257 did not violate the First Amendment. A revised set of the § 2257 regulations was released in December 2009, prompting another complaint against the DOJ and Attorney General Eric Holder in 2010.

California porn tax
The FSC entered the field of lobbying in earnest in 1994, with the retention of a lobbyist in Sacramento, California's state capitol. After a year, the lobbying presence proved itself critical for the health of the national industry. A tax bill was introduced, with the purpose of assisting victims of domestic abuse and rape. An excise tax was proposed for all adult products and services, with the proceeds going to collection of the tax, law enforcement and, if anything remained, to rape counseling centers and battered victim shelters.

Constitutional law had long forbade the targeting of a content-defined tax and this bill was the model of such a tax scheme. Traditionally the industry had relied solely on the judiciary to protect itself against such intrusions, and legislatures across the country have become accustomed to regulating the adult industry without consultation with the parties to be regulated. Both patterns came to a halt with this proposed tax.

The FSC led a coalition of affected businesses and industry groups in fighting the tax. The FSC argued that the tax was a dangerous, unconstitutional precedent and that it would be bad for the state's economy. During the course of the ensuing debate, the economic influence of the adult entertainment industry was established in the minds of the zero votes in support. The bill was defeated at its first committee hearing.

Performer Availability Screening Services 
PASS (Performer Availability Screening Services) is a U.S. organization that maintains a database of STI testing results for pornographic actors. The database is intended to help reduce or prevent the spread of STIs in the porn industry. The organization, formerly known as Adult Production Health and Safety Services (APHSS), was developed by the Free Speech Coalition in 2013, following the closure of Adult Industry Medical Health Care Foundation.

Performers are tested every fourteen days for HIV, syphilis, gonorrhea, chlamydia, hepatitis B and C and trichomoniasis. According to PASS, there has not be an on-set transmission of HIV on a regulated set since 2004.

During the global COVID-19 pandemic, a special task force met to determine how to incorporate a test for COVID-19. All performers and crew are now tested for COVID-19 with the date of test posted in the PASS database. Researchers have suggested that the PASS testing system may be a model for other industries.

Banking access
In February 2015, the FSC announced an affiliation with the First Entertainment Credit Union. The arrangement with make member financial services available to approved production studios employees and their families, primarily in the adult film industry. Diane Duke, CEO of the FSC, stated "We are thrilled to be able to offer active FSC members and their families the opportunity to access First Entertainment for their banking needs and many other financial services. Especially because of difficulties faced by industry members that have had their business turned away by other institutions."

Awards

The FSC Lifetime Achievement Awards are given to adult industry businesses and professionals for outstanding achievements and contributions to the adult entertainment industry. They were launched in mid-1988 by the Adult Video Association at its annual Night of the Stars fundraising event, replacing its discontinued Erotic Film Awards. When the association merged into the Free Speech Coalition in late 1992, the new coalition took over the tradition. Previous years' awards are listed at the AVA Wikipedia entry. Starting in 2008 an "Election Bash" in the fall replaced the former Night of the Stars awards ceremony, reflecting the FSC's change in focus from the entertainers to the business side of the industry. The award presentations were normally made late in the year, but starting in 2014 they were changed to January as part of the XBIZ 360 conference, which is also site of the XBIZ Award ceremony. Thus the awards normally presented in late 2013 were given out in January 2014.

The Positive Image Award is presented to "performers that have helped to dispel negative stereotypes and misconceptions connected to work in the adult industry."

The Legacy Award "recognizes innovation, successful business practices and contributions to the industry as a whole."

The Man of the Year Award is "given to business professionals that have shown exceptional leadership in building solid businesses and their communities."

The Woman of the Year Award is "given to business professionals that have shown exceptional leadership in building solid businesses and their communities."

The Leadership Award is given to "business or individual that demonstrates excellence in the adult entertainment industry in leading by example."

The Benefactor of the Year Award recognizes "unwavering support, through philanthropy and advocacy, of adult industry and mainstream causes. As well as setting a good example, the company also has diligently attempted to protect the adult industry business community from legal challenges, business risks and critics."

Pleasure Products Company of the Year goes to the pleasure products company "that has demonstrated constant and unwavering innovation and excellence." Prior to 2015, the award was known as the Novelty Company of the Year award.

Production Company of the Year "goes to the production company that has demonstrated constant and unwavering innovation and excellence. The company’s success not only benefits their individual business but also the industry as a whole. In addition to their creative innovation, the company conducts business with high ethical standards and integrity."

Internet Company of the Year"recognizes excellence, innovation and contributions made to the adult industry overall."

Retailer of the Year "goes to the retailer that has demonstrated constant and unwavering innovation and excellence."

In 2015 a new award, the Christian Mann Courage and Leadership Award, was added. This award is given to "a member of the adult entertainment or pleasure products community who has shown exemplary courage and leadership fighting for the rights and image of the industry."

Award winners

The Free Speech Coalition also presents an Award of Excellence at the Cybersocket Web Awards (won in 2010 by CorbinFisher.com)

See also
 Artistic freedom
 Civil and political rights
 Sex workers' rights
 Sex-positive movement
 Sexual Freedom League
 Sexual revolution

References

External links

 

Censorship in the United States
Censorship of pornography
Political advocacy groups in the United States
Arts and media trade groups
Freedom of expression organizations
Organizations established in 1991
Freedom of speech in the United States
American pornographic film awards
1991 establishments in the United States
Organizations based in California